Syed Abdul Mansur Habibullah known as S. A. M. Habibullah (17 November 1917–14 September 1996) was an Indian politician. He was the Speaker of the West Bengal Legislative Assembly from 24 June 1977 to 13 June 1982. He was Member of the West Bengal Legislative Assembly from the Nadanghat Assembly constituency since 1969 to 1991. He was law minister in West Bengal since 1982 to 1987. He was associated with the Communist Party of India (Marxist). 

Her daughter Mumtaz Sanghamita was a Lok Sabha Member from the Bardhaman-Durgapur Lok Sabha constituency.

References 

1917 births
1996 deaths
People from Bardhaman
University of Calcutta alumni
Speakers of the West Bengal Legislative Assembly
West Bengal MLAs 1969–1971
West Bengal MLAs 1971–1972
West Bengal MLAs 1972–1977
West Bengal MLAs 1977–1982
West Bengal MLAs 1982–1987
West Bengal MLAs 1987–1991
Communist Party of India (Marxist) politicians from West Bengal